Matthew Joseph Servitto (born April 7, 1965) is an American actor known for his role as Special Agent Dwight Harris on The Sopranos and Trask Bodine on All My Children (1989-1990), Deputy Brock Lotus on the Cinemax series Banshee and Representative Donatelle on Brotherhood (2006-2008), and his film roles as Chipmunk in Two Family House (2000), and as Eddie in Hitch (2005).

Early life
Servitto was born in Teaneck, New Jersey and spent his childhood in Detroit, Michigan. He is a graduate of The Juilliard School in New York City.

Career
Servitto appeared as Representative Donald Donatello on the series Brotherhood and had a guest appearance as Carrie Bradshaw's editor Gabe on Sex and the City. He played Lucky Luciano in the 1992 film Mad Dog Coll. He also voiced the character Sam in the 2002 video game Mafia: The City of Lost Heaven.

He appeared in the 2005 film Hitch as Eddie. In the episode "Identity" of the series Body of Proof, he played a father who is mourning the loss of his daughter due to a car crash, and in 2011 he appeared as NYPD Head of Intelligence Deputy Commissioner Soren in "Hall of Mirrors," the thirteenth episode of the first season of the CBS show Blue Bloods.

Since 2012 he has been a series regular on the original HBO series, which plays on Cinemax, Banshee, where he plays Deputy Brock Lotus, and on the Adult Swim television series Your Pretty Face is Going to Hell, where he plays Satan. He also played the role of Dr. Sebastian Reifler for three episodes on the TV series The Blacklist.

Filmography

Film

Television

Video games

References

External links

Matt Servitto at filmreference.com

1965 births
Living people
American male film actors
American male television actors
American people of Italian descent
Juilliard School alumni
Male actors from Detroit
People from Teaneck, New Jersey